Mount Roer is an isolated mountain, 2,085 m, standing 7 nautical miles (13 km) west of Fuglefjellet in the Sverdrup Mountains, Queen Maud Land. Photographed from the air by the German Antarctic Expedition (1938–39). Mapped by Norwegian cartographers from surveys and air photos by Norwegian-British-Swedish Antarctic Expedition (NBSAE) (1949–52) and air photos by the Norwegian expedition (1958–59). Named for Nils Roer, surveyor with the NBSAE.
 

Mountains of Queen Maud Land
Princess Martha Coast